Lukáš Holík (born 23 August 1992) is a professional Czech football midfielder currently playing for MFK Karviná in the Czech First League.

He made his career league debut for Zlín on 15 October 2011 in a Czech National Football League 2–0 away loss at Sokolov. He scored his first league goal one week later in a 1–0 home win against Čáslav.

References

External links 
 
 

Czech footballers
1992 births
Living people
Czech First League players
Czech National Football League players
FC Fastav Zlín players
FK Dukla Prague players
SFC Opava players
Association football midfielders
MFK Karviná players